Yellow Chili is a fashionable restaurant and bar in Victoria Island, Lagos, that specializes in traditional Nigerian and Continental dishes.  It has another location in Ikeja

Description and décor
Each branch sits on two floors. The ground floor of the Victoria Island branch is divided into two main dining areas that lead to a smaller alcove seating area;the upper floor consist of two levels of seating. 
The lower floor of the GRA branch comprises a sizable seating area flanked by two smaller seating areas on each side. The upper floor is set up as a cosy lounge and bar. There is also a private dining room on the ground floor, as well as a garden seating area.

References

Restaurants in Lagos